60000 series may refer to:

Japanese train types
 Odakyu 60000 series MSE electric multiple unit
 Tobu 60000 series electric multiple unit